Boulevard Heights is a neighborhood of St. Louis, Missouri.

Demographics

In 2020 Boulevard Heights' racial makeup was 74.0% White, 6.4% Black, 0.3% Native American, 9.1% Asian, 7.9% Two Or More Races, and 2.2% Some Other Race. 5.5% of the population was of Hispanic or Latino origin.

References 

Neighborhoods in St. Louis